Bear in the Big Blue House is a television program for young children produced for the Playhouse Disney channel by Mitchell Kriegman and The Jim Henson Company. It aired from 1997 until 2006 with 117 episodes plus a separate episode made exclusively for home media on September 3, 2002.

Series overview

Episodes

Pilot (1997)

Season 1 (1997–1998)

Season 2 (1998–1999)

Season 3 (1999)

Surprise Party (2002)

Season 4 (2002–2006)

International airings
The show was shown throughout the world including in the United Kingdom on five and Playhouse Disney UK, on the Australian Broadcasting Corporation in Australia (April 3, 2000 - April 12, 2010) and on RTÉ Two in Ireland.

References

External links
 List of Bear in the Big Blue House episodes at the Internet Movie Database

Lists of American children's television series episodes